StAnza is a poetry festival which takes place in March in the university town of St Andrews, Scotland. Founded in 1998, it celebrated its 10th Anniversary in 2007.  It is the only festival in Scotland dedicated exclusively to poetry.

History
From 1998 to 2002, StAnza was held in October of each year.  However, in 2003 the festival changed to a regular March fixture.

References

External links
 StAnza website

Festivals established in 1998
1998 establishments in Scotland
March events
Poetry festivals in Scotland
Culture in Fife
St Andrews